CJGX (branded as GX94) is a Canadian AM radio station, licensed to Yorkton, Saskatchewan. It broadcasts on an assigned frequency of 940 kHz with 50,000 watts power daytime, and 10,000 watts nighttime. The station airs a country format with studios at 120 Smith Street East in Yorkton.

The station reports news, weather, and sports at the top of each hour, and broadcasts ice hockey games involving the Melville Millionaires , the Yorkton Terriers of the Saskatchewan Junior Hockey League and Swan Valley Stampeders of the  Manitoba Junior Hockey League. CJGX also carries live broadcasts of Saskatchewan Roughriders games.

References

External links
GX94
 

Jgx
Jgx
Jgx
Radio stations established in 1927
1927 establishments in Saskatchewan